Good to Go Lover is a 1986 studio album by American singer Gwen Guthrie. The album was produced by Guthrie, with musicians performing on the album including Larry Levan, two Surface members and Bernie Worrell, a Parliament-Funkadelic keyboardist.

The album spawned one big hit single, "Ain't Nothin' Goin' On but the Rent", reaching number 1 on both the US Billboard Dance Music/Club Play Singles and Hot Black Singles charts and number 42 on the pop chart. "Ain't Nothin' Goin' on But the Rent" was also a big hit in the UK, where it reached number 5 in the UK Singles Chart. The second single released from the album, a cover of "(They Long To Be) Close To You", reached number 25 in the UK.

Track listing

Personnel

Musicians
Michael Clark – keyboards
David Conley – drum programming, keyboards, Moog Bass, synthesizer
Sly Dunbar – drum programming
Steve Ferrone – drums
Gwen Guthrie – vocal arrangement, background vocals, vocals
Bill Hagans – drum programming, keyboards
Gary Henry – keyboards
Brian Morgan –	performer
Onaje Allan Gumbs – performer
Ira Siegel – guitar
David Townsend –	keyboards
Bernie Worrell – keyboards

Production
 Dave Conley, Gregg Mann, Harvey Goldberg, Larry Levan, Matthew "Krash" Kasha – mixing
 Gregg Mann – engineer
 Steve Khan – engineer
 Scott James –	engineer
 Julian Robertson – engineer
 Tom Zepp – engineer
 Kendal Stubbs – engineer
 Bill Wylie – photography
 Jack Skinner – mastering
 Dave Conley – associate producer
 Ernestine Bell – production assistant
 Jerome Gasper – mixing, executive producer
 Gwen Guthrie – producer, mixing

Chart performance

Singles

External links

References 

1986 albums
Boogie albums
Dance-pop albums by American artists
Contemporary R&B albums by American artists